William Collazo Gutiérrez (born 31 August 1986 in Antilla, Holguín) is a Cuban sprinter who specializes in the 400 metres.

Career
He won a bronze medal in the 4 x 400 metres relay at the 2005 Central American and Caribbean Championships. He also competed at the 2007 World Championships, the 2008 Olympic Games and the 2009 World Championships, but without reaching the final round.

His personal best time is 44.93 seconds, achieved at the World Championships in August 2009 in Berlin. He also has 21.27 seconds in the 200 metres, achieved in March 2004 in Havana.

Personal best
200 m: 21.04 s (wind: +0.7 m/s) –  La Habana, 23 May 2010
400 m: 44.93 s –  Berlin, 19 August 2009
400 m (indoor): 46.31 s –  Doha, 13 March 2010

International competitions

1: Did not finish in the final.

References

External links
 
 
 
 William Collazo at EcuRed 

1986 births
Living people
Cuban male sprinters
Athletes (track and field) at the 2008 Summer Olympics
Athletes (track and field) at the 2012 Summer Olympics
Athletes (track and field) at the 2016 Summer Olympics
Athletes (track and field) at the 2007 Pan American Games
Athletes (track and field) at the 2011 Pan American Games
Athletes (track and field) at the 2015 Pan American Games
Pan American Games gold medalists for Cuba
Pan American Games silver medalists for Cuba
Olympic athletes of Cuba
World Athletics Championships athletes for Cuba
Pan American Games medalists in athletics (track and field)
Central American and Caribbean Games gold medalists for Cuba
Competitors at the 2006 Central American and Caribbean Games
Competitors at the 2014 Central American and Caribbean Games
World Athletics Indoor Championships medalists
Central American and Caribbean Games medalists in athletics
Medalists at the 2011 Pan American Games
Medalists at the 2015 Pan American Games
People from Holguín Province
21st-century Cuban people